Airy is software developed by Airy Team for downloading videos from YouTube.

The first version of the product was released in 2013. Written in Objective C it was a basic downloading tool that could process one video at a time. CNET staff in their review says that "It has a very streamlined interface with just a couple of options and a copy/paste mechanic." Additional functionality was added including the capacity to download a few files simultaneously by copy-pasting links in a text editor. The app can convert  downloaded content into a format and resolution of user's choice – HD, SD and low definition. The app is capable of extracting audio files from videos. Starting from version 2.0 the app can download entire YouTube playlists.

Initially developed for Mac OS, Airy also supports Windows. Marina Dan from Softpedia says that "Airy is a useful and reliable piece of software that provides with the means of downloading videos or extracting the audio from selected clips on YouTube"  The Mac version has more features than the one for Windows, including playlists download and ability to pause and resume downloads.

Airy has been included in the lists of the tools recommended for downloading YouTube videos. Some of the tech websites put Airy on the first place in their list of the best YouTube video Downloaders.

See also
 Comparison of YouTube downloaders

References

External links
Windows version product page

Utilities for macOS
Download managers